Monty Python's Total Rubbish is a 2014 boxed set collecting remastered editions of the nine original albums of British comedy troupe Monty Python on nine CDs or ten LPs. It was released on 30 June 2014.

Contents
 Monty Python's Flying Circus
 Another Monty Python Record
 Monty Python's Previous Record
 Matching Tie and Handkerchief
 Live at Drury Lane
 Monty Python and the Holy Grail
 Monty Python's Life of Brian
 Monty Python's Contractual Obligation Album
 Monty Python's The Meaning of Life
 Monty Python's Tiny Black Round Thing

Personnel
Recorded by, engineer, mixed by, producer, music by, edited by, effects, technician, arranged by: Andre Jacquemin
Edited by, effects, arranged by, mixed by, technician, music by, producers: Terry Gilliam, Dave Howman
Engineer (additional): Alan Bailey
Music by: Eric Idle, Michael Palin, Terry Jones,  Fred Tomlison
Arrangements (additional): Fred Tomlison
Produced by: Michael Palin, Terry Jones, Eric Idle, Graham Chapman
Mixed by, produced by: George Harrison (on Lumberjack song)
Performer: Carol Cleveland
Written by, performers: John Cleese, Michael Palin, Terry Jones, Eric Idle, Graham Champman, Terry Gilliam

References

Monty Python compilation albums
2014 compilation albums
2010s comedy albums